The Wakamow Valley Authority is a conservation organization created by the Provincial Government of Saskatchewan in Canada, and dedicated to conserving the cultural and natural resources of the  Wakamow Valley.    The Authority's activities include education, development and conservation.  The Authority may also appoint special constables to exercise some of its responsibilities and provide peacekeeping within the Wakamow Valley, which includes parts of the city of Moose Jaw.

The facilities operated by the Authority include:
 Sportsman's Centre, a 250-seat historic hall 
 Kiwanis River Park Pavilion and Kiwanis River Park Lodge  
 Valley trails and parkland

References

External links
Wakamow Valley Authority

Moose Jaw
Conservation authorities in Saskatchewan